Oscar Saenger (January 5, 1868 – April 20, 1929) was a singing teacher. With the Victor Talking Machine Company he produced a complete course in vocal training in twenty lessons.

Biography
He was born on January 5, 1868, in Brooklyn, New York City to German-American parents.  When he was 18 years old, in 1886, he received a scholarship to the National Conservatory of Music of America.  In 1891 he became the baritone soloist for the New American Opera Company in Philadelphia, Pennsylvania and in 1892 was a soloist for the Arion Society on their European tour.

He married Charlotte Wells on October 5, 1892, in Brooklyn. They had a daughter, actress and dancer Khyva St. Albans.

He died on April 20, 1929, at the Washington Sanitarium in Washington, DC of cancer.  He had been ill for a year and a half. Swami Paramahansa Yogananda performed the funeral rites.

Pupils
He had the following pupils:
 Theodore C. Diers (1880–1942)
 Paul Althouse (1889–1954)
 Mabel Garrison (1886–1963)
 Kathleen Howard (1884–1956)
 Orville Harrold (1878–1933)
 Florence Hinkle (1855–1933)
 Bernice de Pasquali (1873–1925) 
 Leon Rains (1870–1954)
 Marie Rappold (1874–1957)
 Lila Robeson, Louis Kreidler, Henri Scott, Sidonie Spero, Grace Hoffman, Elsie Raker, Fely Clement, Joseph Regneas, Joseph S. Bernstein and Vera Curtis.
 Florence Cole Talbert (1890–1961)

References

External links
 Oscar Saenger recordings at the Discography of American Historical Recordings.

1868 births
1929 deaths
American people of German descent
Deaths from cancer in Washington, D.C.
National Conservatory of Music of America alumni